"S.O.S. (Too Bad)" is a song by American hard rock band Aerosmith.  It was released in 1975 as their third single from their second album Get Your Wings.

Background

Written by Steven Tyler, it is a hard rocking song focusing on sex and sleaze, with a chorus of "I'm a bad, lonely school boy, and I'm a rat, and it's too bad, can't get me none of that."  The song starts off with a fast drum beat and basic guitar riff, then slows down, and builds up once again, with Steven Tyler's rapid-fire, fierce lyrics accompanying.  The song's lyrical content and musical styles are in the vein of "blooze", a grittier hard rock version of blues music, often with lyrics focused on sex, drugs, and urban life.

"S.O.S. (Too Bad") has been described as a proto-punk song, with numerous elements presaging the punk rock explosion, including dark lyrical themes.

Record World said "Here comes [Aerosmith's] hard rock supreme to the rescue."

The song has remained a fan favorite and has been a staple in the setlists on Aerosmith's most recent tours, the Rockin' the Joint Tour and the Route of All Evil Tour.

References

External links

Aerosmith songs
1974 songs
Songs written by Steven Tyler
Song recordings produced by Jack Douglas (record producer)
Columbia Records singles
Protopunk songs